Skin cancer in Australia kills over 2,000 each year, with more than 750,000 diagnosed and treated. Tanning became embedded in Australian culture and proved to be a controversial issue because of its popularity among teens and solarium users, despite correlations between tanning and an increased risk of developing melanoma. Australia experienced relative success through skin cancer prevention campaigns started in the 1980s and continued to invest and promote awareness through government-funded mass media strategies. Although Australia has one of the highest national rates of skin cancer, mortality trends in melanoma stabilized.

Tanning 

Australians culturally identify with the "bronzed Aussie" stereotype,, viewing it as a positive body image associated with recreational sport and exercise-orientated lifestyles. With over 90% of melanomas derived through contact with the sun, skin cancer preventive initiatives in Australia strived to change this perception.

Solariums and tanning salons are widely used and available throughout Australia. Tanning has been a phenomenon since the 1800s, with medical use of phototherapy, emerging popularity of sunbathing, and in the 1970s,  with tanning salons and solariums becoming increasingly popular,  had developed into a worldwide tanning industry. Although the tanning industry in Australia is relatively small by international standards, it has quadrupled in size since 1992. The tanning industry promotes tanning as a process to stimulate higher levels of vitamin D, associating it with reduced likelihood of sunburn and skin cancer, with increased well being and feelings of happiness.

Solarium regulation 
The solarium industry is regulated on a state by state basis. The first states to regulate solarium use (2008) were Victoria, South Australia and Western Australia following the death of skin cancer victim Clare Oliver. The 2008 regulations required solaria to obtain a license, display health warnings. In Victoria, those under 16 and people with fair skin were banned from solaria and 16-17 year olds were required to have parental consent whereas in South Australia and Western Australia, under 18s were banned.

In February 2009, the Victorian Government introduced license changes, including banning under 18s, consistent with the revised Australian standard, released in January 2009. Victorian solarium legalisation was revised in late 2010, strengthening controls around citing evidence of age documents for under 18s.

The Australian standard requires that operators must:
 ban people under 18s; 
 sight evidence-of-age documents for those who may be under 18; 
 ban people with very fair skin (skin type I); 
 provide mandatory health warnings; 
 provide a consent form outlining the risks of solarium use for customers to read and sign;
 complete a skin assessment of each client;
 ensure all staff have completed training in carrying out skin assessments and determining exposure times;
 ensure clients wear protective eyewear.
New South Wales, Queensland, ACT and Tasmania introduced legislation applying these standards in 2009 and 2010. In 2011, the New South Wales government called for public submissions in relation to a proposal to extend the age ban to those under 30. In February 2012 the New South Wales Government announced its intention to ban tanning beds, starting in 2014. In October 2013, the Victorian parliament passed an official ban on solaria to take effect by 2015.  As of 2018, there was illegal solarium use in Australia, often advertised on Gumtree.

Ultraviolet radiation and skin cancer 
Melanoma, basal cell carcinomas and squamous cell carcinomas are predominantly caused by exposure to ultra violet radiation (UVR), and both UVA and UVB radiation has internationally been categorised as carcinogenic.  Artificial UVR primarily used in tanning salons and sunbeds, has generated concern among health officials and it was observed to considerably heighten the risk of developing cutaneous malignant melanoma. A study in 2010 found strong evidence supporting association between indoor tanning salon use and increased risk of developing melanoma. The study demonstrated strong correlations between increased risk of melanomas and carcinogenic ultraviolet radiation related outcomes. These increased risks were specifically associated with younger participants, with tanning and solarium use relatively popular among teens and young adults. An increase of 59% in risk of developing melanoma was associated with people who used sun beds before they were 35.

Awareness 
Australia and New Zealand have the world's highest skin cancer rates. Factors include the large percentage of the population with fair skin prone to skin cancers and the high levels of ambient UV radiation. Similarly the Anglo-Celtic ancestry of many New Zealanders together with their outdoor lifestyle, is presumed to be a dominant factor in the risk, due to the effect of high UV levels on fair skin. The UV Index (UVI), defined as the sun-burning strength of ultraviolet rays (UVR), in Canada ranges between 1 and 10. The National Institute of Water and Atmospheric (NIWA) research recorded that New Zealand (similar latitude to Australia) the UVI exposure often exceeds 13 and is 40% more than that recorded at comparable latitudes in North America. In order to maintain effective prevention and national awareness Australia used a variety of campaigns and initiatives beginning in the early 1980s.  The Slip, Slop, Slap campaign was initiated in 1981 introduced a seagull singing a catchy jingle “Slip on a shirt! Slop on some sunscreen! and Slap on a hat!”, promoted awareness and entered Australian culture. It was so successful that it remained part of the SunSmart slogan, which was updated to read, Slip, Slop, Slap, Slide (on sun glasses), Seek (shaded areas). SunSmart began in 1987, led by an Australian foundation focused on promoting skin cancer awareness. Social education, challenging societal and cultural ideals, is one of SunSmart's methods for promoting awareness and through its many successes now functions throughout all of Australia, under state Cancer Councils.

The first government-funded mass media skin cancer initiative began in Australia during 2006. Its skin cancer awareness message was delivered through radio, television and printed mediums.

Media promotion and education remains a vital and effective tool in Australian skin cancer awareness strategy. Despite its effectiveness members of the public remain indifferent or unaware of the risks caused by inefficient sun protection and skin care.

Mortality 

Skin cancer has three main forms: basal cell carcinoma, squamous cell carcinoma and melanoma. The first two are the most prevalent forms. Although generally non-melanoma carcinomas have lower associations with mortality than melanomas, fatalities occur, with 534 reported deaths in 2011. 434,000 Australians in 2008 underwent treatment for non-melanoma carcinomas. Melanomas have the highest correlation with mortality, killing 1,544 in 2011. Australia shares with New Zealand, the highest diagnosis of melanoma throughout the world and also has the highest diagnosis of non-melanoma carcinomas. In 2011, New Zealand surpassed the Australian rate for invasive melanoma cases and now has the highest melanoma incidence in the world.

Trends in melanoma mortality 
Australia has recorded increased mortality rates of melanoma from the 1950s, continuing to rise until the late 1980s and beginning to steady from 1990 onwards. Australia has some of the world's highest melanoma-related fatalities—double the mortality rates of south and central Europe. The introduction of preventive campaigns correlate with the transition to decreases in melanoma mortality. Sun protection, other forms of primary protection, early detection and increased public awareness have had the greatest impact.

Prevention 
Awareness and early detection are the most efficient tools for avoiding skin cancer and are the basis of many effective prevention campaigns in Australia. Prevention initiatives such as SunSmart promote awareness by advocating effective sun protective methods, sun risk awareness and are an integral part of skin cancer prevention. SunSmart recommends wearing protective clothing, hats, sunscreen, seeking shade from the sun and wearing UV protective eyeware. SunSmart also provides recommendations on how to choose the right protective products. Regular skin checks are another important preventive step.

The standard for skin cancer screening in Australia is self-assessment and occasional clinic screening. Consistent with Australian guidelines for public skin cancer screening, Cancer Council Australia does not recommend annual or regular skin assessment because low national melanoma occurrences do not financially justify national public screening. A 2003 study analysing the effectiveness of skin cancer screening was implemented in northern Germany. Study doctors received 8 hours of training and over a year screened 19% of Schleswig-Holstein’s population. Initially melanoma detection increased 34%. After 5 years the population experienced over 50% decrease in melanoma mortality.

Economic implications of prevention campaigns 
Australia spends more than $2 billion annually treating cancer, with skin cancer the most costly. From 2005-15 over $300 million was spent annually on diagnosis, treatment and pathology-related costs of skin cancer. With $512.3 million spent in 2010 on melanoma carcinomas, costs continued to rise. The number of life-years lost and loss of productivity both have a bearing on the financial cost of the disease. The direct and indirect expenses of skin cancer in the Australian state of New South Wales (NSW) have been investigated. Direct costs included those resources related to skin cancer management, and indirect costs were concerned with premature mortality and morbidity. Review of 150 000 skin cancer patients in NSW (2010) revealed a total lifetime cost estimation of AU$536 million, with 72% of this cost related to direct costs, and the remaining 28% to indirect costs; the direct costs were higher in females and indirect costs higher in males. Prevention initiatives make up an important part of financial expenditure for skin cancer funding and investments. Prevention programs are a productive tool, as they beneficially influence attitudes and behaviours towards skin cancer, but also deliver positive financial returns. A 2009 study analysed the economic impact of prevention programs such as SunSmart. SunSmart demonstrated positive health impacts, was cost effective. The Victoria-based program returned $3.60 for every $1 invested. It concluded that SunSmart prevented 103,000 skin cancers and more than 1,000 related fatalities from 1988-2003. The study found strong evidence that continued investment and support for SunSmart was economically sound and presented beneficial outcomes for Australia.

See also 

Cancer Council Australia
Health in Australia

References 

Cancer in Australia
Integumentary neoplasia